Benjamin Kevin Siegrist (born 31 January 1992) is a Swiss professional footballer, who plays in the Scottish Premiership for Celtic as a goalkeeper. He was a member of the Switzerland squad at the 2012 Olympic Games in London and went on to represent the Swiss Under-21s. In 2009, Siegrist was part of his nation's FIFA U-17 World Cup winning side, during which he also received the competition's inaugural Golden Glove award for best goalkeeper. During seven years in the Aston Villa Academy Siegrist undertook a series of short-term loans to English Football League and Conference sides. After a spell in the Swiss Super League with Vaduz, Siegrist signed for Scottish club Dundee United in 2018.

Club career

Aston Villa
Siegrist was born in Therwil, Basel-Country. Having been spotted playing for local side FC Therwil, Siegrist continued his youth career at FC Basel in his native Switzerland and during his time there he won both the Swiss U-16 league and cup double in 2008. In January 2009, just prior to his 17th birthday, he signed for Aston Villa of the Premier League. He represented the reserve and academy teams, and in July 2010 he linked up with local side Tamworth with a view to a season-long loan. The loan move never materialised, but Siegrist did play for the club in two pre-season friendlies against Rugby Town and Leamington. As a Villa youth player, he helped the club to the reach the final of the 2009–10 FA Youth Cup (which was lost 3–2 on aggregate to Chelsea) and the 2011–12 Premier Reserve League South title.

Ahead of the 2012–13 season Siegrist was promoted to Aston Villa's first team squad, receiving the number 39 shirt in the process.

Loans
Siegrist joined Football League Two side Burton Albion on a one-month loan deal on 28 November 2013. He was given the number one shirt and was named on the bench for Albion's match with Plymouth Argyle on 30 November 2013. He made no appearances, largely due to the form of Dean Lyness, and returned to Aston Villa after one month.

In March 2014 Siegrist joined Cambridge United of the Conference Premier, the fifth tier of English league football, on loan until the end of the season. On 26 March 2014 Siegrist made his professional debut in a 3–0 win away to Salisbury City. Siegrist played three matches for Cambridge conceding only one goal and helping the club to a second-place league finish and ultimately the 2014 Conference Premier play-off Final, before a groin injury ended his spell at the club.

Siegrist joined Solihull Moors of the National League North on a one-month emergency loan on 8 October 2015 having recovered from a serious leg injury in May 2015. He played in the FA Cup third qualifying round for Solihull against Worcester City, the Moors forced a replay with a 1–1 draw in the first match but lost 1–0 in the replay, despite a string of fine saves from Siegrist. Siegrist made his league debut in a 1–1 draw away to Tamworth on 17 October 2015. Siegrist was named man of the match in a 2–2 draw with Lowestoft Town on 7 November 2015, making a string of saves to keep Moors in the game. Following a loan extension until March 2016 his good form continued as Moors moved clear at the top of the league in January 2016, they went on to win the league a few weeks after Siegrist's departure.

On 19 March 2016, Siegrist joined Wycombe Wanderers on loan until the end of the season as cover, ultimately only playing a single match.

Vaduz
Siegrist signed for Vaduz in the Swiss Super League in the Summer 2016 transfer window for a fee of £210,000.

Dundee United
Siegrist signed a two-year contract with Scottish Championship club Dundee United in June 2018. Manager Csaba László initially used Siegrist as understudy to Matej Rakovan, but he had become first choice by the time Robbie Neilson became manager later that year. Siegrist was part of the Dundee United team that were declared Championship winners in 2019–20, and were subsequently promoted to the Scottish Premiership. He made his 100th appearance for the club against Kilmarnock in February 2021. He made 131 saves in Premiership matches during the 2020–21 season, the most of any goalkeeper in the league, and won the club's Player of the Year and Players' Player of the Year awards, despite missing the end of the season with a broken wrist. In June 2021, United rejected an official bid to buy Siegrist from English League One club Ipswich Town. In the following summer, Siegrist left Dundee United as a free agent.

Celtic
On 21 June 2022, Siegrist signed for Celtic as a free agent on a 4-year deal. On 31 August 2022, he made his official debut for the club in a 4-1 away win against Ross County in the Scottish League Cup second round.

International career
Siegrist has been part of Switzerland squads at U17, U18, U19, and U21 level. Siegrist won the 2009 FIFA U-17 World Cup in Nigeria with his nation: the goalkeeper was an integral part of the side that beat the hosts in the final and won the tournament's first Golden Glove award as a result. He was chosen as a backup goalkeeper for Switzerland's U21 squad at the 2011 UEFA European Under-21 Football Championship, but remained an unused substitute throughout the tournament as Switzerland lost 2–0 in the final to Spain. In 2012, Siegrist was chosen as a backup goalkeeper to Diego Benaglio for Pierluigi Tami's 18-man squad to represent Switzerland at the 2012 London Olympic Games.

Career statistics

Honours
Basel Academy
 Swiss U-16 League: 2007–08
 Swiss Cup U-16 Cup: 2007–08

Aston Villa Academy & Reserves
 FA Youth Cup runners-up: 2009–10
 Premier Reserve League South: 2011–12

Cambridge United
Conference Premier runners-up & Play-off winners: 2013–14

Solihull Moors
National League North: 2015–16

FC Vaduz
Liechtenstein Football Cup: 2016–17, 2017–18

Dundee United
Scottish Championship: 2019–20

Switzerland
 FIFA U-17 World Cup: 2009
 UEFA European Under-21 Football Championship runners-up: 2011

Individual
 FIFA U-17 World Cup – Golden Glove: 2009

References

1992 births
Living people
Sportspeople from Basel-Landschaft
Swiss men's footballers
Switzerland under-21 international footballers
Switzerland youth international footballers
Swiss expatriate sportspeople in England
Expatriate footballers in England
Olympic footballers of Switzerland
Footballers at the 2012 Summer Olympics
Association football goalkeepers
Aston Villa F.C. players
Burton Albion F.C. players
Cambridge United F.C. players
Solihull Moors F.C. players
Wycombe Wanderers F.C. players
FC Vaduz players
Dundee United F.C. players
Celtic F.C. players
National League (English football) players
English Football League players
Swiss Super League players
Swiss Challenge League players
Scottish Professional Football League players
Swiss expatriate footballers
Expatriate footballers in Scotland
Swiss expatriate sportspeople in Scotland
Swiss expatriate sportspeople in Liechtenstein
Expatriate footballers in Liechtenstein